Taaha is the combination of two letters "Ta" and "Ha". It is the first verse of surah Ta-Ha in the Quran and one of the mysterious letters; thus the meaning of name is unknown. According to Islamic scholars it is an epithet of Muhammad.

Given name
Taha Akgül (born 1990), Turkish sport wrestler
Taha Al-Abid, Palestinian poet
Taha Csddcm (1914–1977), Turkish diplomat
Taha Falaha, Syrian Islamist
Taha Hussein (1889-1973), Egyptian writer and intellectual
Taha Malik, Pakistani-American record producer, musician, rapper and film score composer
Taha Yassin Ramadan (1938-2007), former Iraqi vice-president

Surname
Abdul-Razzaq Ahmed Taha, Iraqi chess player
Mahmoud Taha (born 1942), Jordanian artist
Paolo Taha (born 1990), Filipino basketball player
Rachid Taha (born 1958), Algerian singer
Riad Taha (1927-1980), Lebanese journalist and president of the Lebanese Publishers Association
Walid Taha  (born 1968), Israeli Arab politician
Wasil Taha (born 1952),  Arab member of the Knesset
Yousef Taha (born 1988), Filipino basketball player

Places
La Taha, municipality in the Alpujarras region of the province of Granada, Spain

See also
Taha (disambiguation)
Yasin (name)
Arabic name

References

Arabic-language surnames
Arabic masculine given names
Turkish masculine given names